Christensenella is a genus of non-spore-forming, anaerobic, and nonmotile bacteria from the family Christensenellaceae. The species C. minuta has been published and validated, and  C. timonensis and C. massiliensis have  been proposed as novel species of the genus Christensenella, all isolated from human feces. C. minuta in the gut has been associated with reduction in body weight and adiposity of mice. In a test on 977 volunteers, humans with higher levels of Christensenella in their guts were found to be more likely to have a lower body mass index than those with low levels. Christensenella are better represented in persons who are metabolically healthy. However, there is a link to possible pathogenic qualities of C. minuta in humans. An 18-year-old male presented with symptoms of appendicitis. Lab work revealed C. Minuta was found in his bloodstream. Upon removal of the appendix, his symptoms and blood levels of C. minuta disappeared.

References

Clostridiaceae
Gram-negative bacteria
Bacteria described in 2011